Yeremeyev (masculine) or Yeremeyeva (feminine) is a Russian surname that is derived from the male given name Yeremey and literally means Yeremey's. It may refer to:

 Ihor Yeremeyev (1968–2015), Ukrainian politician
 Sergei Yeremeyev (writer) (born 1959), Russian children's writer and poet
 Vitali Yeremeyev (born 1975), Kazakhstani ice hockey goaltender
 Vladimir Yeremeyev (born 1988), Russian football player

Russian-language surnames
Patronymic surnames
Surnames from given names